This is a list of notable Old Bradfieldians, being former pupils of Bradfield College in Berkshire, England:

Academics
Edward Armstrong (1846–1928), historian and Pro-Provost, Queen's College, Oxford
William Ormston Backhouse (1885–1962), agricultural geneticist
Zachary Nugent Brooke (1883–1946), historian
Arthur John Butler (1844–1910), scholar and professor of Italian language at University College London
Anthony Collett (1877–1929), author and writer of natural history
Joseph Darracott (1934–1998), art historian and writer
Peter Hadland Davis (1918–1992), British botanist
Michael Devitt (born 1938), Australian philosopher
Cyril Falls (1888–1971), military historian
Gerald Gazdar (born 1950), Professor of Computational Linguistics at the University of Sussex
Martin Gore (1951–2019), oncologist
Richard Lancelyn Green (1953–2004), scholar of Arthur Conan Doyle and Sherlock Holmes
Vivian H. H. Green (1915–2005), historian and Rector of Lincoln College, Oxford
Douglas Kell (born 1953), biochemist and chief executive of the Biotechnology and Biological Sciences Research Council
Sir William Lawrence, 3rd Baronet (1870–1934), English horticulturalist
Terence Mitchell (1929–2019), British museum curator
Sir Martin Ryle (1918–1984), Astronomer Royal
Martin Wight (1913–1972), historian and international affairs expert

Art and entertainment
Sir Timothy Ackroyd (born 1958), English actor and Baronet
Richard Adams (1920–2016), author
Matt Barber (born 1983), actor
John Bennett (1928–2005), actor
Anthony Calf (born 1960), actor
Isabella Calthorpe (born 1980), model and actor
James Chalmers, actor
Sir Francis Cook, 4th Baronet (1907–1978), artist and fourth holder of the Cook Baronetcy
Edward Gordon Craig (1872–1966), modernist theatre practitioner 
Louis de Bernières (born 1954), novelist
Simon Drew (born 1952), illustrator and cartoonist
Sir Edmund Elton, 8th Baronet, inventor and studio potter
John Etheridge, Jazz guitarist
Hubert J. Foss (1899–1953), composer and music publisher
John Hamilton(1919–1993), British army officer and artist
Tony Hancock (1924–1968), comedian
Misan Harriman (born 1977), photographer and founder of What We Seee
Anthony Hawtrey (1909–1954), actor and theatre director
Thomas Heathcote (1917–1986), character actor
Thomas Hennell (1903–1945), artist
John Hollingsworth (1916–1963), orchestral conductor
David Lloyd Jones (born 1942), architect
Russell Lloyd, British film editor
Hilary Minster (1944–1999), actor 'Allo 'Allo!
Alistair Petrie (born 1970), English actor
Terence Reese (1913–1996), bridge player and writer
Gerald Savory (1909–1996), playwright
Darja Schabad (born 1983), Russian vocalist and actress
John Oldrid Scott (1841–1913), architect
George Blackall Simonds (1843–1929), sculptor
Dan Stein (born 1977), DJ Fresh
William Strang (1859–1921), painter and engraver
Snoo Wilson (1948–2013), playwright, screenwriter and director
George Grey Wornum (1888–1957), architect

Broadcasters
Nick Clarke (1948–2006), journalist and BBC Radio 4 presenter
Tim Dellor (born 1975), BBC Local Radio presenter
Ben Geoghegan (born 1965), BBC News presenter and correspondent
Nick Higham (born 1954), BBC News correspondent
Peter Jones (1930–1990), broadcaster
Will Lyons (born 1976), journalist, broadcaster and wine writer
Ed Robinson (born 1971), Sky Sports presenter
Jonny Saunders (born 1975), former BBC sports commentator

Diplomats and civil servants
Morrice James, Baron Saint Brides (1916–1989), High Commissioner in Pakistan, India and Australia
G. Norman Knight (1891–1978), civil servant and indexer
George Paine (1918–1992), Registrar General
 Gerald Henry Summers (1885–1925), British colonial administrator
R. V. Vernède (1905–2003), colonial administrator in India and writer
 Gordon Wetherell (born 1948), diplomat and former Governor of the Turks and Caicos Islands
Dennis Charles White KBE CMG (1910–1983), British colonial administrator in Sarawak and first High Commissioner for Brunei
Ronald Wingate (1889–1978), British colonial administrator, soldier, delegate on the Tripartite Commission for the Restitution of Monetary Gold and author

Law
Quentin Edwards QC (1925–2010), judge
Sir Richard Henriques (born 1943), judge and Justice of the High Court of England and Wales
Nicholas Hilliard (born 1959), Recorder of London and Senior Judge at the Old Bailey
The Hon Alan Robertson SC (born 1950), judge of the Federal Court of Australia.

Medical

Naval and military
 Captain Sir Hubert Acland, 4th Baronet Acland (1890–1976), officer in the Royal Navy
 Major-General Arthur Edward Barstow (1888–1942), officer in the British Indian Army and commander of the 9th Infantry Division during the Battle of Malaya
 Vice Admiral Sir Jeremy Blackham (born 1943), Royal Navy officer who served as Deputy Commander in Chief Fleet
Brigadier Mike Calvert (1913–1998), Chindits and Special Air Service commander
Air Chief Marshal Sir Christopher Courtney (1890–1976), Royal Air Force officer
Vice Admiral Richard Bell Davies VC (1886–1966), Royal Navy officer and aviator
William Robert Aufrère Dawson (1891–1918), Commanding Officer of the 6th battalion, Queen's Own Royal West Kent Regiment and recipient of DSO with Three Bars
Lieutenant General Sir John Foley, former Commander British Forces in Hong Kong
Admiral of the Fleet Bruce Fraser, Baron Fraser of North Cape (1888–1981), Chief of the Naval Staff
Air Chief Marshal Sir Guy Garrod (1891–1965), Royal Air Force officer
Admiral John Henry Godfrey, Admiral in the Royal Navy and Royal Indian Navy
 Colonel Mark Nicholas Gray (born 1966), decorated Royal Marines Officer
Air Chief Marshal Sir Roderic Hill MC (1894–1954), Royal Air Force officer, Vice Chancellor of the University of London
Marshal of the Royal Air Force Sir Andrew Humphrey (1921–1977), Chief of the Air Staff and Chief of the Defence Staff
 General Sir Peter Leng (1925–2009), British Army officer and Master-General of the Ordnance
 Lieutenant General Hugh Massy (1884–1965), British Army general during World War II
 Lieutenant-General George Molesworth CSI CBE (1890–1968), Deputy Chief of General Staff of Army Headquarters India and later Military Secretary to the India Office
 Admiral Sir Arthur Palliser (1890–1956), Royal Navy officer during World War I
 Air Vice-Marshal Sir Richard Peirse (1931–2014), Royal Air Force officer who served as Defence Services Secretary
Geoffrey Saxton White (1886–1918), Victoria Cross Recipient
 Major-General Michael Scott (born 1941), British Army officer who went on to be Military Secretary

Other
Benedict Allen (born 1960), explorer
 Henry Besant (1972–2013), co-creator of Olmeca Tequila
 Alastair Boyd, 7th Baron Kilmarnock (1927–2009)
 Anthony Collett, journalist, nature writer and sometime governor
Sir William Lawrence, 4th Baronet
H. Pelham Lee (1877–1953), internal combustion engine pioneer and founder of the Coventry Climax Engines company
 James Stunt (born 1982), financier, collector and philanthropist
 David Parkin (born 1991) Health policy and data specialist

Politics
Peter Ainsworth (1956–2021), Conservative former Member of Parliament for East Surrey and member of the Shadow Cabinet
Richard Benyon (born 1960), Former Conservative Member of Parliament for Newbury
Sir Dennis Boles, 1st Baronet (1861–1935), British Conservative politician
Sir Reginald Brade (1864–1933), Under-Secretary of State for War, 1914–1920. Gentleman Usher to the Sword of State
Sir Michael Marshall (1930–2006), Former Conservative Member of Parliament for Arundel
Stephen Milligan (1948–1994), former Conservative MP
Sir John Nott (born 1932), Secretary of State for Defence
David Owen, Baron Owen (born 1938), Foreign Secretary and co-founder of the SDP
 Robert Henry Pooley (1878 - 1954), lawyer and political figure in British Columbia
Martin Stevens (1929-1986), British Conservative Party politician
Charles Tannock (born 1957), Conservative Member of the European Parliament
Sir Cyril Townsend (1937-2013), politician
Henry Usborne(1909–1996), British Member of Parliament

Religion
 Charles Aylen (1882–1972), Anglican Bishop
 Russell Barry (1890–1976), former Anglican Bishop of Southwell
 Edward Bidwell (1866–1941), former Bishop of Ontario
 Claude Blagden (1874–1952), former Anglican Bishop of Peterborough
 Michael Coleman (1902–1969), Anglican Bishop
 Cecil Cooper (1884–1964), fourth Bishop in Korea
 John Drury (born 1936), former Dean of Christ Church, Oxford and chaplain of All Souls College, Oxford
 Michael Hare Duke (1924–2014), Author and former Bishop of St Andrews, Dunkeld and Dunblane
 Eric Hamilton (1890–1962), Anglican Bishop
 George Jeudwine (1849–1933), Anglican priest and Fellow of The Queen's College, Oxford
Archibald Robertson (1853–1931), Principal of King's College London and Bishop of Exeter
 Michael Scott-Joynt (1943–2014), Bishop of Winchester 
Cecil Tyndale-Biscoe (1863–1949), missionary in Kashmir

Royalty
Ronald Muwenda Mutebi II (born 1955), current King of Buganda

Sport
Gus Atkinson (born 1998), Surrey cricketer
 Faiq Bolkiah (born 1998), Bruneian footballer
 Ben Brocklehurst (1922–2007), English cricketer
 Dai Wai Tsun (born 1999), Hong Kong footballer
 Hugo Darby (born 1993), English cricketer
 Nico de Boinville (born 1989), National Hunt and Gold Cup winning jockey
 Charles Ashpitel Denton (1852–1932), English amateur footballer and solicitor
 Bernard Elgood (1922–1997), English cricketer
 Robert Fetherstonhaugh (born 1932), former English cricketer
 Ollie Hancock (born 1987), British racing driver
 Sam Hancock (born 1980), British racing driver
 Ryan Higgins (born 1995), Middlesex & England Under-19 cricketer
 Frederick Hill (1847–1913), English cricketer
 Henry Jollye (1841–1902), English cricketer
 Christopher Ling (1880–1953), English cricketer
 Okeover Longcroft (1850–1871), English cricketer
 Michael Mence (1944–2014), English cricketer
 Harrison Newey (born 1998), British racing driver
 Mark Nicholas (born 1957), cricketer and TV presenter
 Hamza Riazuddin (born 1989), English cricketer
 Graham Roope (1946–2006), Surrey and England cricketer
 Brian Stevens (born 1942), former English cricketer
 Hugh Tapsfield (1870–1945), English cricketer
 Marco Micaletto (born 1996), Italian footballer

References